The Indiscreet Woman is a 1927 German silent comedy film directed by Carl Boese and starring Jenny Jugo, Maria Paudler and Georg Alexander.

The film's sets were designed by the art director Franz Schroedter.

Cast
 Jenny Jugo as Frau Marschall
 Maria Paudler as Frau Leon
 Georg Alexander as Herr Marschall
 Kurt Vespermann as Herr Leon
 Paul Graetz as Noel
 Julius Falkenstein as Der Baron
 Sinaida Korolenko as Tänzerin
 Jaro Fürth as Der Herr Hofrat

References

Bibliography
 Bock, Hans-Michael & Bergfelder, Tim. The Concise CineGraph. Encyclopedia of German Cinema. Berghahn Books, 2009.

External links

1927 films
1927 comedy films
Films of the Weimar Republic
German silent feature films
German comedy films
Films directed by Carl Boese
German black-and-white films
Phoebus Film films
Silent comedy films
1920s German films
1920s German-language films